PTH may refer to:

 Parathyroid hormone
 Port Huron (Amtrak station), Michigan, US, station code
 Perth railway station, Scotland, station code
 GNU Portable Threads in computing
 Pass the hash attack in computing
 phenylthiohydantoin, an amino acid derivative formed by the Edman degradation
 Plated through-hole in PCB through-hole technology
 Polskie Towarzystwo Historyczne, the Polish Historical Society
 Provincial Trunk Highway in list of Manitoba provincial highways
 Standard Chinese, also known as putonghua and abbreviated PTH